Henock Trouillot (1923–1988) was a Haitian historian, playwright, and novelist. He wrote historical and sociological books, such as:

 Historiographie d'Haïti (1954)
 La Condition des Nègres Domestiques à Saint-Domingue (1955)
 Economie et Finances de Saint-Domingue (1965)
 La Vengeance du Mapou (1967)
 Le Gouvernement du Roi Henri Christophe (1974)

He was the uncle of Michel-Rolph Trouillot, the anthropologist and historical theorist.

References

 

1923 births
1988 deaths
20th-century Haitian historians
Haitian male writers
20th-century male writers
Henock